Ahmad, or Ahmed, is a common Arabic given name.

Ahmad or Ahmed may also refer to:

Places 
 Achmad Yani International Airport, an airport in Semarang, Indonesia
 Sultan Ahmed Mosque, Istanbul
 Ahmedabad, India
 Ahmednagar, India
 Ahmad, Iran, in Kerman Province, Iran
 Ahmad (crater), in the northern hemisphere of Saturn's moon Enceladus
 Ahmadnagar, Pakistan

Entertainment
 Ahmed (film), a 2006 film
 Ahmad (album)

People

Given name 
Ahmad Aali (born 1935), Iranian photographer and artist
Mohammed Ahmed Abdalla Abbaro (1933–2016), London-based Sudanese ceramicist and potter
Abu Sa'id Ahmed ibn Mohammed ibn Abd al-Jalil al-Sijzi (c. 945 - c. 1020), Iranian Muslim astronomer, mathematician, and astrologer
Ahmad Abdalla (born 1979), Egyptian film director, editor and screenwriter
Mohammed Ahmed Abdallah (born 1953), Sudanese physician and human rights activist
Ahmad Kamal Abdullah (born 1941), Malaysian poet, novelist, playwright, literary critic
Ahmed Abdullah (born 1947), jazz trumpeter who was a prominent member of Sun Ra's band
Ahmed Abukhater, architect, environmental scientist, urban and regional planner by trade
Ahmed Achour (born 1945), Tunisian composer and conductor
Ahmad Adaya (1927–2006), American Muslim real estate tycoon and philanthropist
Ahmad Anatolly (1894–1973), Azerbaijani theatre actor

Surname 
Afroz Ahmad, Indian environment scientist and development administrator
Ahmad ibn 'Imad al-Din, Persian physician and alchemist
Aminah L. Ahmad, African-American ballet dancer
Asad Ahmad, BBC journalist and news presenter
Ashab Uddin Ahmad (1914–1994), Bangladeshi writer, educator and politician
Aziz Ahmad (novelist) (1914–1978), Urdu poet, short story writer, novelist, translator, historian, research scholar from Pakistan
Darin Ahmad (born 1979), Syrian artist, poet and writer
Habib Ahmad, Pakistan scientist, Professor of Genetics and vice-chancellor of Islamia College, Peshawar in Peshawar, Pakistan
Ibrahim Ahmad (1914–2000), Kurdish writer, novelist and translator
Ishfaq Ahmad, D.Sc., Minister of State, SI, HI, NI, FPAS (1930–2018), Pakistani nuclear physicist, emeritus professor of high-energy physics
Israr Ahmad (1940–2010), Indian theoretical nuclear physicist and professor at Aligarh Muslim University
Jamil Ahmad (writer) (1931–2014), Pakistani civil servant, novelist and story writer
Khalil Ahmad (basketball) (born 1996), American basketball player in the Israeli Basketball Premier League
Kamal Ahmad (born 1965), American lawyer, educator, social entrepreneur, and CEO of Asian University for Women Support Foundation
Kontek Kamariah Ahmad (1911–2006), scored many “firsts” for women in the co-operative movement, education and politics in Malaysia
Manzoor Ahmad, DSc (born 1934), Pakistani scientist and philosopher of science
Maslamah Ibn Ahmad al-Majriti (c. 950 – 1007), Arab Muslim astronomer, chemist, mathematician, economist and scholar in Islamic Spain
Munshi Siddique Ahmad (8201–2011), Bangladeshi rice scientist
Qazi Kholiquzzaman Ahmad, Bangladeshi economist and development thinker and activist
Rafiq Ahmad, Pakistani scientist and beekeeping expert
Saiyed Saghir Ahmad (born 1935), judge of the Supreme Court of India
Soanya Ahmad or Reid Stowe (born 1952), American artist and mariner
Talat Ahmad, Indian Earth Scientist and Professor at Department of Geology, University of Delhi
Yousef Ahmad (born 1955), Qatari artist, art adviser, collector, writer and educator in the field of art
Zakariyya Ahmad (1896–1961), Egyptian musician and composer
Ziauddin Ahmad CIE, MP (1878–1947), mathematician, parliamentarian, logician, natural philosopher, political theorist, educationist, scholar
Abu Sayeed M Ahmed, architect and architectural conservation specialist from Bangladesh
Aftab Ahmed (photojournalist) (1934–2013), Bangladeshi photojournalist
Ahmed al-Madini, scholar, a novelist, a poet, and a translator from Morocco
Ahmed es-Sikeli, baptised a Christian under the name Peter, was a eunuch and kaid of the Diwan of the Kingdom of Sicily
Anna Molka Ahmed (1917–1995), Pakistani artist and a pioneer of fine arts in the country after its independence in 1947
Asif Ahmed (scientist) FRSB, British entrepreneurial scientist
Dilruba Ahmed, Bangladeshi American writer, educator, and poet
Iqbal Z. Ahmed (born 1946), businessman and philanthropist of Pakistan
Kafil Ahmed (born 1962), contemporary Bangladeshi poet, singer and artist
Kausar Bashir Ahmed (1939–2006), Pakistani architect, townplanner and educationist
Modhir Ahmed (born 1956), Iraqi-Swedish artist
Nissar Ahmed, Indian Educationist, Entrepreneur, Philanthropist, Founder Chancellor of Presidency University, Bangalore
Novera Ahmed (1939–2015), modern sculptor of Bangladesh
Qanta A. Ahmed, British physician specializing in sleep disorders
Said Salah Ahmed, Somali playwright, poet, educator and filmmaker
Salauddin Ahmed (born 1967), contemporary Bangladeshi architect
Shafi Ahmed, surgeon, teacher, futurist, innovator and entrepreneur
Shahabuddin Ahmed (artist) (born 1950), Bangladeshi painter
Shoaib Ahmed (businessman) (born 1964), Indian software evangelist
Wasi Ahmed, Bangladeshi novelist and short story writer
Ameena Ahmad Ahuja, Indian painter, calligrapher, writer and linguist, known for her Urdu poetry-inspired art works
Ahmad ibn Ajiba (1747–1809), Moroccan saint in the Darqawa Sufi Sunni Islamic lineage
Ahmad Alaadeen (1934–2010), jazz saxophonist and educator whose career spanned over six decades
Jalal Al-e-Ahmad (8206–1969), Iranian novelist, short-story writer, translator, philosopher, sociologist, anthropologist & ethnographer
Ahmed Ali (writer) (1910–1994), Pakistani novelist, poet, critic, translator, diplomat and scholar
Madanur Ahmed Ali, Indian surgical gastroenterologist from Chennai
Thani Ahmed Al-Zeyoudi, the Minister of Climate Change and Environment for the United Arab Emirates
Muhammad ibn Muhammad ibn Ahmad Abū ‘Abdallāh Badr al-Dīn (1423–1506), Egyptian-born astronomer and mathematician
Ahmed Al Bahrani (sculptor) (born 1965), Iraqi sculptor
Abu Zayd Ahmed ibn Sahl Balkhi, Persian Muslim polymath: a geographer, mathematician, physician, psychologist and scientist
Ahmed Benyahia (born 1943), Algerian artist
Ahmed Best (born 1973), American actor, voice actor, and musician
Ahmed Bouzfour (born 1945), Moroccan novelist
Nazir Ahmad Bulbul, Wakhi language poet and an educationist
Ahmed the Calligrapher, Christian saint and official of the Ottoman Empire in the seventeenth century
Ahmed Dawood (1899–2002), Pakistani industrialist, pioneer merchant and a philanthropist
Ahmed Djoghlaf (born 1953), the Executive Secretary of the Convention on Biological Diversity under the United Nations Environment Programme (UNEP)
Ahmed Ertegun (1923–2006), Turkish-American businessman, songwriter and philanthropist
Ahmed Fagih (born 1942), Libyan novelist, playwright, essayist, journalist and diplomat
Ahmed Hajeri (born 1948), Tunisian painter 
Ahmed Hassanein, KCVO, MBE (1889–1946), Oxford-educated Egyptian courtier, diplomat, Olympic athlete in fencing, photographer, writer, politician, geographic explorer, tutor then chamberlain to King Farouk
'Ali Ahmad Ibn Hazm (8206–1064), Andalusian poet, polymath, historian, jurist, philosopher, and theologian, born in Córdoba, (Spain)
Ahmed Gaffer Hegazi (born 1948), Professor of Microbiology and Immunology in the department of Zoonotic Diseases, National Research Centre, Egypt
 Ahmad Heryawan, Governor of West Java (2008–Incumbent)
Abu ‛Abbas Ahmad Ibn al-Banna (1256–1321), Moroccan-berber mathematician, astronomer, Islamic scholar, Sufi, and a one-time astrologer
Mujaddid Ahmed Ijaz, Ph.D. (1937–1992), Pakistani-American experimental physicist noted for discovering new neutron-deficient isotopes
Ahmed Mohamed Iman, Director General of the Fisheries, Marine Resources and Environment Sector of the Ministry of the National Resources of Somalia
Ahmed el Inglizi, English renegade architect and engineer who worked for the Sultan of Morocco Mohammed ben Abdallah in the 18th century
Sultan Ahmed Ismail (born 1951), Indian soil biologist and ecologist
Ahmad Jafari (born 1938 in Iran), veteran architect based in USA whose career extends over 6 decades
Ahmad Jamal (born 1930), American jazz pianist, composer, bandleader, and educator
Syed Rashid Ahmed Jaunpuri (1889–2001), Sufi saint, author, scholar of Hadith and Quran, and Muslim missionary in Bangladesh
Ahmad ibn Muhammad ibn Kathir al-Farghani. (800/805-870) a.k.a. Alfraganus in the West, famed astronomer in the Abbasid court in Baghdad
Ahmed Mohamed Kathrada (1929–2017), South African politician, political prisoner and anti-apartheid activist.
Naseer Ahmed Khan (born 1936), Pashtun tribal chieftain, social activist and public philanthropist in Baluchistan, Pakistan
Shamim Ahmed Khan (1938–2012), sitarist and composer, and notably, a student of Pandit Ravi Shankar
Ahmad Khani, Ahmad-i Khani (8206–1707), Kurdish writer, poet, astronomer and philosopher
Maqbool Ahmed Lari, Indian social worker, philanthropist, Urdu littérateur, and the founder of Mir Academy, Lucknow
Ahmed Mater (born 1979), Saudi artist and physician
Ahmed Muradbegović (1898–1972), Bosniak writer, dramatist and novelist
Ahmed Naguib el-Hilaly (1891–1958), Egyptian lawyer and educator who served as Prime Minister of Egypt twice in 1952
Ahmad Nahavandi, Persian astronomer of the 8th and 9th centuries
Ahmad Nakhchivani, Azerbaijani medieval architect
Bashar Ahmad Nuseibeh, (born 1967), Professor of Computing at The Open University in the United Kingdom
Osman Ahmed Osman (1917–1999), Egyptian engineer, contractor, entrepreneur, politician
Ferdous Ahmed, Bangladeshi actor
Şeker Ahmed Pasha (1841–1907), Ottoman painter, soldier and government official
Ahmed Pochee (1939–1998), British-Indian wine merchant and entrepreneur, founder of Oddbins and the Great Wapping Wine Company
Ahmad Danny Ramadan (born 1984), Syrian-Canadian novelist, public speaker, columnist, and a gay refugee activist
Muneer Ahmad Rashid, PhD, D.Sc., PAS Gold Medal, FPAS (born 1934), Pakistani Mathematical Physicist and Emeritus Professor of Applied and Mathematical Physics
Ahmed Saadawi (born 1973), Iraqi novelist, poet, screenwriter and documentary film maker
Ahmed Al Safi (born 1971), Iraqi sculptor and painter
Basheer Ahmed Sayeed (1900–1984), Indian judge, politician and educationist, member of the Madras Legislative Council
Ahmed Sefrioui (1915–2004), Moroccan novelist and pioneer of Moroccan literature in the French language
Haji Syed Ahmed Shah, saint who migrated from Saudi Arabia to Pakistan in 15th/16th century to preach Islam
Ahmed Sharif (1921–1999), educationist, philosopher, critic, writer and scholar of medieval Bengali literature
Ahmed Siddiqui (born 1996), Formerly missing person
Ahmed Sofa (1943–2001), Bangladeshi writer, thinker, novelist, poet, and public intellectual
Ahmad Vaezi (born 1963), Iranian philosopher, scholar and clergyman
Ahmad Wahib (1942–1973), Indonesian progressive Islamic intellectual
Ahmed Yacoubi (1928–1985), Moroccan painter and storyteller
Ahmad Yadgar, Mughal-era author of the Tārikh-i-Salātin-i-Afghāniyah, a history of the Afghan monarchs of India
Ahmad Yani, National Hero of Indonesia
Zareef Ahmad Zareef (born 1943), Kashmiri poet, writer, social activist and environmentalist
Ahmad Ali El Zein (born 1956), Lebanese novelist, documentary film maker and television journalist
Ahmed Zewail (1946–2016), Egyptian-American scientist, known as the father of femtochemistry
Ahmad Zoay, Pakistani painter and sculptor
Ahmad Zohadi, Iranian architecture scholar, publisher and researcher
 Rosli Ahmat (1970–2002), Singaporean executed armed robber and murderer

See also
Ahmady
Maktoobat e Ahmad (Letters of Ahmad), 3-volume collection of all available letters, written by Mirza Ghulam Ahmad
Tablet of Ahmad (Arabic) (or Lawh-i-Ahmad), a tablet written by Bahá'u'lláh, the founder of the Bahá'í Faith, while he was in Adrianople
Ahmadabad (disambiguation)
Ahmadi (disambiguation)
Surnames of Maldivian origin
Maldivian-language surnames